The  Fuckparade is an annual summer technoparade in Berlin. The event began in 1997 as a demonstration against the increasing commercialisation of culture and public life and the misuse of the right of assembly by purely commercial ventures, in particular the Love Parade. The event has had problems with the authorities since 2001, but in 2007 the Federal Administrative Court of Germany decided that it met the definition of a demonstration.

See also
Techno Viking
List of electronic music festivals
List of technoparades

References

External links

 

Music festivals established in 1997
Parades in Germany
Music festivals in Berlin
Internet memes
Technoparade
1997 establishments in Germany
Anti-consumerism
Electronic music festivals in Germany
Free parties
Summer events in Germany